The Alpine Shire is a local government area in the Hume region of Victoria, Australia, located in the north-east part of the state.

It includes the towns of Bright, Dinner Plain, Mount Beauty and Myrtleford. There are two unincorporated areas within the shire: the areas around Mount Hotham and Falls Creek. It was formed in 1994 from the amalgamation of the Shire of Bright, Shire of Myrtleford, and parts of the United Shire of Beechworth, Shire of Oxley, Shire of Yackandandah and Shire of Omeo.

The Shire is governed and administered by the Alpine Shire Council; its seat of local government and administrative centre is located at the council headquarters in Bright, it also has service centres located in Dinner Plain, Mount Beauty and Myrtleford. The Shire is named after its location in the popular alpine region of Victoria.

Over 90% of the Shire is public land. The Shire has two major national parks, the Alpine National Park and Mount Buffalo National Park. The Shire's economy is based on tourism, agriculture and forestry.

Council

Current composition
The council is composed of seven councillors elected to represent an unsubdivided municipality.

Administration and governance
The council meets in the council chambers at the council headquarters in the Bright Municipal Offices, which is also the location of the council's administrative activities. It also provides customer services at both its administrative centre in Bright, and its service centres in Dinner Plain, Mt Beauty and Myrtleford.

Townships and localities
The 2021 census, the shire had a population of 13,235 up from 12,337 in the 2016 census

^ - Territory divided with another LGA

See also
 List of localities (Victoria)
 List of places on the Victorian Heritage Register in Alpine Shire

References

External links
Alpine Shire Council official website
Metlink local public transport map
Link to Land Victoria interactive maps

Local government areas of Victoria (Australia)
Hume (region)
 
Victorian Alps